Mikhail Alexandrovich Magerovski (born 7 April 1986 in Moscow) is a Russian former competitive figure skater. He won silver at the 2005 Skate Israel and two gold medals on the ISU Junior Grand Prix series. He also qualified to compete at two Junior Grand Prix Finals. He was coached by Viktor Kudriavtsev in Moscow. He is the younger brother of Sergei Magerovski, an ice dancer who represented the United States.

Programs

Competitive highlights 
JGP: Junior Grand Prix

References

External links
 

1986 births
Russian male single skaters
Figure skaters from Moscow
Living people